Benjamin Franklin Jackson represented Charleston County, South Carolina in the South Carolina House of Representatives from 1868 until 1870.

By order of the North Carolina General Assembly he was legitimated and granted certain other rights.

He was a Baptist missionary and church organizer.

References

19th-century American politicians
People from Charleston County, South Carolina
Baptist missionaries from the United States
Year of birth missing
Year of death missing
Members of the South Carolina House of Representatives